Lupo has been borne by at least two ships of the Italian Navy and may refer to:
.
 , a  launched in 1937 and sunk in 1942
 , a  launched in 1976. Sold to Peru in 2004 and renamed Palacios. 

Italian Navy ship names